Naranbhai Parikh was an entrepreneur based in the small town of Petlad in Gujarat, India. He was one of the major contributors to the town, by way of the companies and social institutions he created.

Early life and family 

Naranbhai was born in the late 19th century ( June 21, 1869) to the family of a middle class lender, Keshavlal Parikh, of Petlad.  He was the eldest of four brothers and one sister.  He borrowed a small amount from his father to launch his own business setup.

Career 

Naranbhai founded the Petlad Turkey Red Dyeworks Company Limited in the town of Petlad.  It grew into a major conglomerate, with offices across British India and overseas in Europe and Latin America.  The dye works led to the creation of two large mills in Petlad, Keshav Mill and Rajratna Naranbhai Keshavlal Mill, also known as Rajratna Mill.

Charity 

Naranbhai Parikh believed in the concept of institutionalized charity, wherein profit-making organizations must directly contribute to the society, before distributing profit among stock owners.  He also, however, focused on the creation of lasting institutions that contribute through building abilities, in addition to direct service.  In line with that concept, he established the Petlad Pathshala, which has educated several renowned Hindu scholars, including Pramukh Swami of the Swaminarayan Sect, and Shri Krishnashankar Shastri of Bhagwat Vidyapith at Sola (Ahmedabad).  He also founded several "dharamshalas", or rest houses for pilgrims and travelers.  Furthermore, he contributed to several educational institutions through Turkey Red and his charitable trust.

Honor 

Naranbhai grew to be one of the biggest industrialists of his time in India.  Such was his reputation that when Sayajirao Gaekwad, the erstwhile Maharaja of Baroda State, needed to borrow money for his education while in England, he was granted a loan only when he provided reference of Naranbhai Keshavlal, his subject from Petlad of the Baroda state.  Surprised by the popularity and generosity of an industrialist from his state, Sayajirao conferred the title of "Rajratna", or "jewel of the kingdom", to Naranbhai, immediately upon his return from England.  The N. K. High School of Petlad, where personalities including Sardar Vallabhbhai Patel, the first Deputy Prime Minister of India, studied, has been named in honor of his contributions to the school and the town.

Legacy 

Naranbhai died at the early age of 39 (March 28, 1910).  He was survived by his wife Rukshmaniben, and daughter Savita.  Considering the chronic sickness prevalent in his family then, he doubted if any of them would survive, and willed his assets to his brothers Chandulal and Ramanlal Parikh.  His legacy continued through his brothers and his grandson Manharlal Shah, who continued his culture of entrepreneurship and contribution.  Manharlal dedicated his life to the Co-operative Revolution, founding several co-operative factories, dairies, banks, and other institutions.  His son, Haren Shah, is the founder of Peach Technovations Private Limited, and Peach Computers in Gandhinagar, and is a well-known educationalist and contributor to Petlad.

Businesspeople from Gujarat